Stanisław Ożóg (born May 27, 1953 in Sokołów Małopolski) is a Polish politician. He was elected to Sejm on September 25, 2005 getting 16922 votes in 23 Rzeszów district, candidating from the Law and Justice list.

See also
Members of Polish Sejm 2005-2007

External links
Stanisław Ożóg - parliamentary page - includes declarations of interest, voting record, and transcripts of speeches.
 Stanisław Ożóg - official page -

1953 births
Living people
People from Rzeszów County
Members of the Polish Sejm 2005–2007
MEPs for Poland 2014–2019
Law and Justice MEPs
Members of the Polish Sejm 2007–2011
Members of the Polish Sejm 2011–2015
Members of the Senate of Poland 2019–2023
Polish geodesists
Mayors of places in Poland